In 2013 a succession of successful jailbreaks by al-Qaeda led INTERPOL to release a global alert calling for investigation of their role in jailbreaks in nine member countries.  The following is a list of incidents in which sources have suggested the involvement of an al-Qaeda affiliate organization in attempted jailbreaks, though the involvement of the organization and its affiliation with al-Qaeda may remain uncertain.  This list includes instances where officials have collaborated in the release of prisoners in exchange for the release of hostages taken for this purpose, whether they were taken within the prison or elsewhere.

References 

Jailbreaks
Al Qaida
Jailbreaks by al-Qaida affiliates